A cold quasar is a galaxy with a quasar at the center and abundant cold gas that can still produce new stars.

Discovery
The discovery of cold quasars was formally announced in 2019 by Professor Allison Kirkpatrick at the 234th meeting of the American Astronomical Society in St. Louis.

References

Galaxies